Jahurul Haque Sardar is a politician from the Khulna District of Bangladesh and an elected a member of parliament from Khulna-6.

Career 
Sardar was elected to parliament from Khulna-6 as an independent candidate in 1988 Bangladeshi general election.

References 

Possibly living people
People from Khulna District
Year of birth missing (living people)
4th Jatiya Sangsad members